Now You Are One Of Us is an album by the American rock band The Paper Chase.

Track listing

References

2006 albums
The Paper Chase (band) albums
Kill Rock Stars albums